= Urban Plates =

American casual dining restaurant chain

- Type: Casual dining restaurant chain
- Industry: Restaurant
- Genre: Health-conscious
- Founded: 2011 (first restaurant in San Diego)
- Number of locations: 22 (as of 2020) (2020)
- Area served: Southern California, with expansion to Northern California, Washington DC, Illinois, and New York planned
- Products: Salads, sandwiches, soups, and meats
- Revenue: $4.5 million per restaurant (2017) (2017)
- Number of employees: 900 (2020) (2020)

Urban Plates is an American casual dining restaurant chain. The chain is primarily based in Southern California where 14 of its 22 restaurants reside, including its first 2011 restaurant in San Diego. With capital raised from Goldman Sachs, the chain is expanding to Northern California, Washington DC, Illinois, and New York, with a target of 40 restaurants. Its 2017 annual sales were $4.5 million per restaurant and employed 900 staff in 2020. The restaurant's primary demographic are health-conscious customers, with salads, sandwich, soups, and meats on its menu.

The company was not eligible for federal tax assistance during the 2019 coronavirus outbreak, but was exempted from local health regulations requirements providing workers with 80 hours of paid leave for medium- and large-sized companies.
